The 2022 Ivy League women's basketball tournament was the scheduled postseason women's basketball tournament for the Ivy League of the 2021–22 NCAA Division I women's basketball season. It was held March 11 and 12, 2022, at the Lavietes Pavilion on the campus of Harvard University in Boston. Princeton won its third Ivy League championship, earning an automatic bid to the 2022 NCAA Division I women's basketball tournament, the team's ninth appearance.

Seeds
The top four teams in the Ivy League regular-season standings qualified for the tournament and were seeded according to their records in conference play, resulting in a Shaughnessy playoff. If a tie for any of the top four positions exists, tiebreakers are applied in the following order:
 Head-to-head record between teams involved in the tie.
 Record against the top team(s) not involved in the tie in order of conference record, going down through the seedings until the tie is broken.
 Average of the teams' ranking in the following computer systems: NCAA NET, Sagarin, KenPom, and ESPN Basketball Percentage Index.

Schedule

Bracket

See also
 2022 Ivy League men's basketball tournament

Footnotes

References

Ivy League women's basketball tournament
Tournament
Ivy League women's basketball tournament
Ivy League women's basketball tournament
Ivy League women's basketball tournament
Basketball competitions in Boston
College basketball tournaments in Massachusetts
Women's sports in Massachusetts